The Jackson Carnegie Library is a library building operated by the Jackson District Library, located at 244 West Michigan Street in Jackson, Michigan. It was listed on the National Register of Historic Places in 1980.

History
The Jackson District Library was founded in 1863 by a group of Jackson citizens. In 1884, the organization was taken over by the City of Jackson. In 1901, Andrew Carnegie donated $70,000 to the city, for the purpose of constructing a new library building. The city retained the Milwaukee architectural firm of Ferry and Clas to design the new structure. Construction began in  1903, and was completed in 1906. The building served as the city's library through 1978, when it merged with other local libraries, and became the main branch for the newly created. In 1981, a circular structure was built at the rear of the library to provide additional space.

Description
The Jackson Carnegie Library is a rectangular, two-story, Neoclassical structure constructed of Indiana limestone. It measures 99 feet long by 66 feet wide. It has a gently sloping flat roof. The front facade is symmetrical, and is approached by a broad central staircase with massive end walls topped with iron lamp stands. The entrance to the building is slightly recessed, and is flanked with six engaged Ionic columns which extend upward to a modillioned cornice. The cornice continues around the sides of the building. The windows are set into two-story arched recesses topped by a keystone. On the front, the spandrels between the first and second-story windows contain stone lion heads and floral swags.

References

External links
Jackson Carnegie Library

		
National Register of Historic Places in Jackson County, Michigan
1863 establishments in Michigan